Masquerades is a novel written by Kate Novak and Jeff Grubb that takes place in the Forgotten Realms setting. It is based on the campaign setting for the Dungeons & Dragons fantasy role-playing game.

Plot summary
The novel features the continued adventure of the heroine Alias and her companion Dragonbait from the novel Azure Bonds and takes place after the events in the Finder's Stone trilogy. The novel takes place in the city of Westgate and follows the struggle against the Night Masks and their mysterious leader known only as The Faceless.

The story of the newly ascended god Finder continues in Finder's Bane and Tymora's Luck.

Reviews
Review by John C. Bunnell (1995) in Dragon Magazine, November 1995
Kliatt

References

External links
 Forgotten Realms novels at Candlekeep.com
 Masquerades at Candlekeep.com

1995 American novels
American fantasy novels
Forgotten Realms novels